Coolac is a village in the Riverina region of New South Wales, Australia in Gundagai Council.

History

The place name Coolac is derived from the local Aboriginal name for a plant which was abundant in the area and also from the Aboriginal word meaning "native bear".

Coolac Post Office opened on 1 June 1870.

The 11 kilometre section of the Hume Highway at Coolac was the last two-lane section of highway between Sydney and the Sturt Highway interchange. Since 1986, plans had been drawn-up for the Coolac bypass, with a review of environmental factors report completed in 1997 but construction did not commence until May 2007 with the project opening in August 2009 - Under AusLink.

In August 2009, the Coolac bypass was officially opened.

Bald Archy
The satirical Bald Archy art competition (named from the more prestigious Archibald Prize) began in Coolac at the Coolac Festival of Fun, launched by Peter Batey. The home of this competition is now the Museum of the Riverina in Wagga Wagga and it also travels to Sydney and Melbourne for exhibition once Maude the Cockatoo, who is the official judge, selects the winning entries each year.

Coolac Geological Site 

The distinctive rock assemblage over a  site  provides insights into events in the continental evolution of eastern Australia. The rocks here were part of the oceanic crust and mantle, normally not exposed on the Earth's surface. The rock from the mantle is called Coolac Serpentinite.

References

External links

Towns in New South Wales
Cootamundra-Gundagai Regional Council